Ellinthorp is a rural town and a locality in the Southern Downs Region, Queensland, Australia.

Geography 
Dalrymple Creek forms the southern boundary of the locality and the South Western railway line forms the eastern boundary with the Ellinthorp railway station serving the town, which is immediately west of the station.

Contrary to the Queensland Government's normal rules that no locality should be an "island" within another locality, Ellinthorp is completely surrounded by the locality of Talgai.

The town is no longer populated.

History 
The township was known as Talgai before it was renamed Ellinthorp on 19 March 1931. The name Ellinthorp presumably comes from the Ellinthorp railway station, which was originally named Dalrymple after Dalrymple Creek, but which was renamed Ellinthorp on 28 January 1916 after the Tasmanian home of pastoralist brothers Charles George Henry Carr Clark and George John Edwin Clark of Talgai. Although there are over 100 town lots in the town plan, many have not been developed while others are used for farming, suggesting Ellinthorp was intended to be a more populous town.

References 

Towns in Queensland
Southern Downs Region
Localities in Queensland